Quercus emoryi, the Emory oak, is a species of oak common in Arizona (including inside Saguaro National Park), New Mexico and western Texas (including inside Big Bend National Park), United States, and northern Mexico (Sonora, Chihuahua, Coahuila (including Parque Nacional Maderas del Carmen), Durango, Nuevo León, and San Luis Potosí). It typically grows in dry hills at moderate altitudes.

Description 

Quercus emoryi is a wintergreen tree in the red oak group, retaining its leaves throughout the winter until new leaves are produced in spring.

The seeds of this tree are called chich’il in Ndee, wi-yo:thi or toa in O’odham, bellotas in Spanish, and acorns in English. The English and Latin botanical names for this tree come from the name of a United States Army surveyor, Lieutenant William Hemsley Emory, who surveyed the area that had become known as West-Texas in the 1840s.

Ecology
The Emory acorn is sweet and is an important food for livestock, deer, squirrels, the Gila chipmunk, and birds such as quail and wild turkeys. Deer and livestock also browse the foliage.

Uses 
Native American groups have eaten Emory acorns traditionally, ceremonially, and in contemporary cuisine. The acorns are most commonly ground into meal.

Emory oak health and habitat have been challenged in 2020, including in Oak Flat, Arizona in the Tonto National Forest by the Resolution Copper mining company's large copper mine.

According to the United States Department of Agriculture:Emory oak acorns are a critically important resource for Western Apache Tribal Nation, both as a food source and due to its cultural and ceremonial uses. For decades, Apache elders watched in frustration as groves produced less acorn yield and declined in overall health. The ... Emory oak Collaborative Tribal Restoration Initiative is restor[ing] and protect[ing] Emory oak stands ... to ensure the long-term persistence of Emory oak. Habitat loss, fire suppression, livestock grazing, groundwater reductions, species competition and climate change have all impacted the Emory oak population. This program uses tribal traditional ecological knowledge to guide goals and activities.

References

External links
 United States Department of Agriculture Plants Profile: Quercus emoryi

emoryi
Trees of Sonora
Trees of Chihuahua (state)
Trees of Coahuila
Trees of Durango
Trees of Nuevo León
Trees of San Luis Potosí
Trees of the Southwestern United States
Trees of the South-Central United States
Flora of Arizona
Plants described in 1848
Taxa named by John Torrey
Flora of the Sierra Madre Occidental
Oaks of Mexico
Flora of the Sierra Madre Oriental